is a Japanese animation studio founded in 2013 by former staff from Brain's Base.

Works

Television series

Original video animations

Films

See also
Takahiro Omori

References

External links
 
 

Animation studios in Tokyo
Japanese animation studios
Mass media companies established in 2013
Japanese companies established in 2013
Mitaka, Tokyo